Arthingworth is a civil parish and village in the West Northamptonshire area of the county of Northamptonshire, England. The population of the civil parish at the 2011 census was 238.

The villages name probably means, 'enclosure connected with Earn(a)'.

Location and communications

Between 1859 and 1960 the village was served by Kelmarsh railway station about 1 mile south-west of the village and running trains between Northampton in the south and Market Harborough in the north.

Administration
The village has its own Parish Council.

Notable buildings
The Historic England website contains details of a total of eight listed buildings in the parish of Arthingworth, all of which are Grade II apart from St Andrew's Church, which is Grade II*. They include:
St Andrew's Church, Braybrooke Road
Arthingworth Lodge, Kelmarsh Road
Arthingworth Manor. This was left as a shell in 1967 revealing walls probably from an older house. A stable block remains, now converted to a house but incorporating the Manor House staircase.
Bosworth House
Glebe House, Kelmarsh Road
Hall Farmhouse, Oxendon Road

References

External links 

 
 

Villages in Northamptonshire
West Northamptonshire District
Civil parishes in Northamptonshire